Sandalodes is a genus of jumping spiders that was first described by Eugen von Keyserling in 1883. S. scopifer, a black spider with white markings, is a common species in eucalypt forests on the Darling Downs.

Species
 it contains nine species, found only in Papua New Guinea, Australia, and on Sulawesi:
Sandalodes albovittatus (Keyserling, 1883) – Australia (Queensland)
Sandalodes bernsteini (Thorell, 1881) – New Guinea
Sandalodes bipenicillatus (Keyserling, 1882) (type) – Australia (Queensland, New South Wales)
Sandalodes celebensis Merian, 1911 – Indonesia (Sulawesi)
Sandalodes joannae Zabka, 2000 – Australia (Western Australia)
Sandalodes minahassae Merian, 1911 – Indonesia (Sulawesi)
Sandalodes pumicatus (Thorell, 1881) – New Guinea
Sandalodes scopifer (Karsch, 1878) – New Guinea, Australia
Sandalodes superbus (Karsch, 1878) – New Guinea, Australia

References

External links
 Wattle Jumping Spider - S. scopifer (photographs, description)
 Ludicra Jumping Spider - S. superbus (=Bavia ludicra) (description, photographs)

Salticidae genera
Salticidae
Spiders of Oceania
Taxa named by Eugen von Keyserling